Commissioner v. Idaho Power Co., 418 U.S. 1 (1974), was a United States Supreme Court case.

Background 
Taxpayer, Idaho Power Co., used its own equipment and employees to improve and add to its capital facilities. On its books, Idaho Power capitalized the construction-related depreciation on this equipment used for construction of the capital asset. But for income tax purposes, the taxpayer deducted the entire amount of depreciation on equipment used in construction of the capital asset under § 167(a) including the amount capitalized as construction costs.

Issue
Whether, for federal income tax purposes, a taxpayer is entitled to a deduction from gross income under § 167(a) of the Code for depreciation on equipment the taxpayer owns and uses in the construction of its own capital facilities, or whether the capitalization provision of § 263(a)(1) of the Code  bars the deduction.

Rule
Construction-related expense items, such as tools, materials, and wages to construction workers are treated as part of the cost of acquisition of a capital asset. Reasonable wages paid in carrying on of a trade or business qualify as a deduction from gross income, but when wages are paid in connection with construction or acquisition of a capital asset they must be capitalized and are then entitled to be amortized over the life of the capital asset so acquired.

§ 263(a)(1) of the Internal Revenue Code denies a deduction for any amount paid out for construction or permanent improvement of facilities. This extends to the cost of acquisition, construction, or erection of buildings. Treas. Reg. § 1.263(a)-2(a).

Application
The cost of the transportation equipment used for construction activities was paid out in the same manner as the cost of supplies, materials, and the wages of construction workers. The taxpayer does not question the capitalization of these other items, because they are elements of the cost of acquiring a capital asset. Thus, construction-related depreciation should also be capitalized.

§ 161 and § 261 of the Internal Revenue Code require that the capitalization provision of § 263(a) take precedence, on the facts here, over § 167(a).

Conclusion
The equipment depreciation allocable to taxpayer's construction of capital facilities is to be capitalized.

Significance
This case deals with the costs and tax consequences related to producing real and tangible personal property, when a taxpayer constructs property instead of purchasing it. This result was codified in  § 263A of the Internal Revenue Code (known as the uniform capitalization rules or the Unicap rules). This requires the capitalization of all direct and indirect costs allocable to the construction or production of real property or tangible personal property. It also applies to the acquisition of inventory materials and wages paid to builders or other production workers.

Direct costs include raw materials and wages paid to builders or other production workers. Treas. Reg. § 1.263A-1(e)(2).

Indirect costs include repairs, depreciation, utilities, rent, sales tax, property tax, insurance, storage, and packaging. Treas. Reg. § 1.263A-1(e)(3).

See also
 List of United States Supreme Court cases, volume 418

References

External links

United States Supreme Court cases
United States Supreme Court cases of the Burger Court
United States taxation and revenue case law
1974 in United States case law
Idaho Power